KTEL ("Common Funds of Bus Proceeds") is the main intercity public transport bus service in Greece. It is a cooperation of 62 regional bus companies, usually named after the regional unit they serve, e.g. KTEL Imathias for Imathia. KTEL was founded in 1952. The combined KTEL fleet numbers 4.199 buses.

The KTEL companies provide 80% of all passenger transportation in Greece. Interregional transport, e.g. to Athens, is provided by most of the KTEL companies.

Urban KTEL 
Local KTEL companies provide service to the cities and villages of the local regional unit.

References

External links

Information about KTEL companies, with links to the local websites

Transport companies established in 1952
Bus companies of Greece
Greek companies established in 1952